Sacred Heart Higher Secondary School (also referred to as S.H School) is located in Thevara, Ernakulam Kerala, India run by the Carmelites of Mary Immaculate (CMI), an indigenous Syrian Catholic religious congregation founded in 1831. School Code of Sacred Heart is 07063.

Organizations

 Student Police Cadets
 N.S.S
 Scouts and Guides

Notable alumni

References

Christian schools in Kerala
Primary schools in Kerala
High schools and secondary schools in Kochi
Educational institutions established in 1965
1965 establishments in Kerala